Jacqueline Kelly is a New Zealand-born American writer of children's books.

Personal life
Kelly was born in New Zealand and moved with her family to Canada when she was young, then to Texas. She earned degrees in law and medicine and continues to practice medicine in Austin, Texas.

Writing career
Kelly's first published story appeared in the Mississippi Review in 2001.

In 2009 her first novel, The Evolution of Calpurnia Tate, was published. It tells the story of a young girl growing up in Texas in 1899, learning what it means to be a woman in turn-of-the-century America, and learning about science and the natural world from her grandfather. It was a Newbery Honor Book, one runner-up for the annual Newbery Medal. A follow-up, The Curious World of Calpurnia Tate, was published in 2015 to much acclaim.

Kelly has also written a sequel to The Wind in the Willows called Return to the Willows, published in October 2012.

Bibliography

Calpurnia Tate 
 The Evolution of Calpurnia Tate (2009)
 The Curious World of Calpurnia Tate (2015)

Calpurnia Tate, Girl Vet 
 Skunked! 
 Counting Sheep (2017)
 Who Gives a Hoot? (2017)
 A Prickly Problem (2018)
A Squirrelly Situation (2019)

Other 
 Return to the Willows (2012)

References

External links
 
 

Living people
Year of birth missing (living people)
Place of birth missing (living people)
American writers of young adult literature
American historical novelists
Writers from Austin, Texas
Physicians from Texas
Newbery Honor winners
21st-century American novelists
21st-century American women writers
American women novelists
Women writers of young adult literature
Women historical novelists
Novelists from Texas